José Lei, ISO (30 October 1930 – 23 February 2023) was a Hong Kong civil servant. He was a director of the Architectural Services Department, was chief architect at the former Public Works Department, and was the designer of the Hong Kong Cultural Centre.

He was also a Hong Kong Olympic sports shooter. He competed in two events at the 1968 Summer Olympics. He also competed at the 1966, 1970 and 1974 Asian Games. In 1989, Lei was made Companion of the Imperial Service Order.

References

External links
 

1930 births
2023 deaths
Hong Kong male sport shooters
Commonwealth Games competitors for Hong Kong
Shooters at the 1974 British Commonwealth Games
Olympic shooters of Hong Kong
Shooters at the 1968 Summer Olympics
Shooters at the 1966 Asian Games
Shooters at the 1970 Asian Games
Shooters at the 1974 Asian Games
Macau sportsmen
Asian Games competitors for Hong Kong
Hong Kong architects
Companions of the Imperial Service Order